The Men's doubles event at the 2010 South American Games was held on March 25 at 9:00.

Medalists

Results

References
Report

Doubles